Cruising is a 1980 American crime thriller film written and directed by William Friedkin and starring Al Pacino, Paul Sorvino, and Karen Allen. It is loosely based on the novel of the same name by New York Times reporter Gerald Walker about a serial killer targeting gay men, particularly those men associated with the leather scene in the late 1970s. The title is a double entendre, because "cruising" can describe both police officers on patrol and men who are cruising for sex.

Poorly received by critics upon release, Cruising performed moderately at the box office. The shooting and promotion were dogged by gay rights protesters, who believed that the film stigmatized them. The film is also notable for its open-ended finale, which was criticized by Robin Wood and Bill Krohn as further complicating what they felt were the director's incoherent changes to the rough cut and synopsis, as well as other production issues.

Plot 
In New York City amidst a hot summer, body parts of men are showing up in the Hudson River. The police suspect it to be the work of a serial killer who is picking up gay men at West Village bars such as the Eagle's Nest, the Ramrod, and the Cock Pit, then taking them to cheap rooming houses or motels, tying them up and stabbing them to death.

Officer Steve Burns, who is slim and dark-haired like the victims, is sent deep undercover by Captain Edelson into the world of gay S&M and leather bars in the Meatpacking District in order to track down the killer. Burns is at first reluctant to accept the assignment, but he is ambitious and sees a high-profile case as a way to rapidly advance his career. He rents an apartment in the area and befriends a neighbor, Ted Bailey, a struggling young gay playwright who does tech support to pay the bills. Burns's undercover work takes a toll on his relationship with his girlfriend Nancy, due to his inability to tell her the details of his current assignment and his developing friendship with Ted, who himself is having relationship problems with his jealous and overbearing dancer boyfriend, Gregory.

Burns mistakenly compels the police to interrogate a waiter, Skip Lee, who is intimidated and beaten to coerce a confession before the police discover Skip's fingerprints do not match the killer's. Burns is disturbed by the brutality, and tells Captain Edelson he didn't agree to the assignment so people could be beaten simply for being gay. Exhausted by the undercover work, Burns is close to quitting, but Edelson convinced him to continue with the investigation. Edelson in turn reprimands the officers who interrogated Skip.

Following a new lead, Burns investigates students at Columbia University who studied with one of the previous victims, a college professor. Burns thinks that he has found the serial killer: Stuart Richards, a gay music graduate student who has schizophrenia. He breaks into his apartment and discovers a box of letters to his father. Burns later meets Richards in Morningside Park and cruises him for sex. After Burns asks him to pull his pants down, Richards tries to stab him, but Burns stabs him in the side, incapacitating him. Burns takes Richards into custody, where his fingerprints are a match for those discovered at one of the stabbings.

Shortly afterward, Ted's mutilated body is found. The police dismiss the murder as a lover's quarrel turned violent and put out an arrest warrant for Gregory, with whom Burns had an earlier confrontation due to Gregory's jealousy. The police consider the case closed with Richards in custody. 

Burns, now promoted to detective, moves back in with Nancy. As Burns shaves his beard in the bathroom, Nancy tries on his leather jacket, cap, and aviator sunglasses—exactly what the killer wore. Burns stares at himself in the mirror and then briefly looks at the camera.

Cast

Production 
Philip D'Antoni, who had produced Friedkin's 1971 film The French Connection, approached Friedkin with the idea of directing a film based on New York Times reporter Gerald Walker's 1970 novel Cruising, about a serial killer targeting New York City's gay community. Friedkin was not particularly interested in the project. D'Antoni tried to attach Steven Spielberg, but they were not able to interest a studio. 

A few years later, Jerry Weintraub brought the idea back to Friedkin, who was still not interested. However, Friedkin changed his mind following a series of unsolved killings in gay leather bars in the 1970s and the articles written about the murders by Village Voice journalist Arthur Bell. Friedkin also knew a police officer named Randy Jurgensen who had gone into the same sort of deep cover that Pacino's Steve Burns did to investigate an earlier series of gay murders; Paul Bateson, a doctor's assistant who had appeared in Friedkin's 1973 film The Exorcist was implicated (but never charged) in six of the leather bar murders, while being prosecuted for another murder. All of these factors gave Friedkin the angle he wanted to pursue in making the film. Jurgensen and Bateson served as film consultants, as did Sonny Grosso, who earlier had consulted with Friedkin on The French Connection. Jurgensen and Grosso appear in bit parts in the film.

In his research, Friedkin worked with members of the Mafia, who at the time owned many of the city's gay bars. Al Pacino was not Friedkin's first choice for the lead; Richard Gere had expressed a strong interest in the part, and Friedkin had opened negotiations with Gere's agent. Gere was Friedkin's choice because he believed that Gere would bring an androgynous quality to the role that Pacino could not.

The film was intended to depict gay cruising as it existed at the Mineshaft, which does appear in the novel. However, that bar is not named in the movie because it would not allow filming. Scenes from the movie were instead filmed at the Hellfire Club, which was decorated to resemble the Mineshaft. Regulars from the Mineshaft also appeared as extras, and scenes were shot in streets and other locations near the Mineshaft. Additionally, Pacino visited the Mineshaft while researching his role. 

The Motion Picture Association of America (MPAA) originally gave Cruising an X rating. Friedkin claims he took the film before the MPAA board "50 times" at a cost of $50,000 and deleted 40 minutes of footage from the original cut before he secured an R rating. The deleted footage, according to Friedkin, consisted entirely of footage from the clubs in which portions of the film were shot and consisted of "[a]bsolutely graphic sexuality...that material showed the most graphic homosexuality with Pacino watching, and with the intimation that he may have been participating." In some discussions, Friedkin claims that the missing 40 minutes had no effect on the story or the characterizations, but in others he states that the footage created "mysterious twists and turns (which [the film] no longer takes)"; that the additional footage made the suspicion that Pacino's character may himself have become a killer more clear; and that the missing footage simultaneously made the film both more and less ambiguous. When Friedkin sought to restore the missing footage for the film's DVD release, he discovered that United Artists no longer had it. He believes that UA destroyed it. Some obscured sexual activity remains visible in the film as released, and Friedkin intercut a few frames of gay pornography into the first scene in which a murder is depicted.

This movie represents the only film soundtrack work by the punk rock band the Germs. They recorded six songs for the film, of which only one, "Lion's Share," appeared. The cut "Shakedown, Breakdown" was written and recorded especially for the film by cult band Rough Trade. Soundtrack director Jack Nitzsche had initially attempted to include two songs—"Endless Night" and "Devil's Sidewalk"—by Graham Parker and the Rumour in the film, but legal issues prevented the songs from being used. The songs appeared on Parker's 1980 album The Up Escalator.

Friedkin asked gay author John Rechy, some of whose works were set in the same milieu as the film, to screen Cruising just before its release. Rechy had written an essay defending Friedkin's right to make the film, but not defending the overall film. At Rechy's suggestion, Friedkin deleted a scene showing the Gay Liberation slogan "We Are Everywhere" as graffiti on a wall just before the first body part is pulled from the river, and added a disclaimer:

"This film is not intended as an indictment of the homosexual world. It is set in one small segment of that world, which is not meant to be representative of the whole."

Friedkin later claimed that it was the MPAA and United Artists that required the disclaimer, calling it "part of the dark bargain that was made to get the film released at all" and "a sop to organized gay rights groups." Friedkin claimed that no one involved in making the film thought it would be considered as representative of the entire gay community, but gay film historian Vito Russo disputes that, citing the disclaimer as "an admission of guilt. What director would make such a statement if he truly believed that his film would not be taken to be representative of the whole?"

Friedkin has said that he was disappointed with Pacino's lack of professionalism during the shoot, claiming that he was often late and didn't add any ideas to the character or film. On the other hand, Pacino has said that Friedkin didn't let him know how to interpret the end of the film, saying "Am I the killer at the end of the picture or have I gone gay? To this day I don’t know because Friedkin never told me how to play my final scene." In his autobiography, Friedkin says that a single shot can change the whole plot of a movie when talking about Cruising, implying that the ambiguous ending might not have been planned from the start. However, some elements in the movie do suggest that Burns might be the killer, like a scene at the beginning showing him wearing the killer's cap and the fact that Richards doesn't attack first, and that Burns stabs him. Furthermore, the killer is said to sing a nursery rhyme before he kills and Burns is the only person who sings one in the movie.

Protests 
Throughout the summer of 1979, members of New York City's gay community protested against the production of the film. Protests started at the urging of journalist Arthur Bell, whose series of articles on unsolved murders of gay men inspired the film. Gay people were urged to disrupt filming, and gay-owned businesses to bar the filmmakers from their premises. People attempted to interfere with shooting by pointing mirrors from rooftops to ruin lighting for scenes, blasting whistles and air horns near locations, and playing loud music. One thousand protesters marched through the East Village demanding the city withdraw support for the film. As a result of interference, the movie's audio largely was overdubbed in order to remove the noise caused by off-camera protesters.

Al Pacino said that he understood the protests but insisted that upon reading the screenplay he never at any point felt that the film was anti-gay. He said that the leather bars were "just a fragment of the gay community, the same way the Mafia is a fragment of Italian-American life," referring to The Godfather, and that he would "never want to do anything to harm the gay community."

Release and reception 
General Cinema Corporation successfully blind bid to exhibit the film. After previewing the film, the company executives were so shocked by the film and felt that it should be X-rated that they refused to release it in their theaters.

Cruising was released February 15, 1980, in the United States and had a box office take of $19.8 million.

Critical reaction to the film was highly negative, and LGBT activists publicly protested against Cruising. However, critical opinion has warmed somewhat over the years as the film has been reassessed. , the film holds a 50% approval rating at Rotten Tomatoes based on 60 reviews, with a weighted average of 6.2/10. The site's consensus states, "Cruising glides along confidently thanks to filmmaking craft and Al Pacino's committed performance, but this hot button thriller struggles to engage its subject matter sensitively or justify its brutality." Upon its original release, Roger Ebert gave Cruising two and a half out of four stars, describing it as well-filmed and suspenseful, but adding that it "seems to make a conscious decision not to declare itself on its central subject"—the true feelings of Pacino's character about the S&M subculture, which are never explored to Ebert's satisfaction.

Critic Jack Sommersby's comments typified the contemporary criticism directed at non-political matters such as character development and the changes made when the film was transferred from a novel to a film:
 [On the character of the serial killer] "The closest we get to a motivation comes from his imaginary conversations with his deceased, formerly-disapproving father, who tells his boy, 'You know what you have to do,' which sets him off to kill, and, again, we're baffled as to the connection Friedkin's trying to make. Was the father's disapproval pertaining to his son being gay, and is the son trying to win back his father's approval by killing men of a sexual nature the father has a seething hatred for? If so, there's no indication of any of this. In fact, we don't even know if the father knew his son was gay before passing on."
 [On the character of Officer Steve Burns] "Gone is the backstory of his having harassed gays at an off-base bar when he was in the Army; also gone is his racism, along with his seemingly asexual nature in the first half. Instead, he's been made a regular, happy-go-lucky guy with a steady girlfriend. One can easily surmise Friedkin's motivation here: using someone identifiable to lead us into the underworld of black leather and kinky sex... [W]e're brought up short, and the cop's emotional progression seems stunted, as if Friedkin simply didn't care. We see the cop engaging in some heavy vaginal intercourse with his girlfriend, but we don't know if he's normally this semi-rough, if he's doing so under the pretense that the rougher, the manlier he must be—freaking away any trace of gay, if you will. A week later, the girlfriend complains about his not wanting her any more, and he replies, 'What I'm doing is affecting me.' How? Turning him off sex with women, or off sex altogether in light of what he's seeing and experiencing every night? Again, we do not know."

The second major criticism of the film at its release came from gay activists who felt that the film had a homophobic political message and that it portrayed gay men as being attracted to violence, which could in turn justify homophobic hate crimes. Ebert wrote "The validity of these arguments is questionable." However, several critics have taken issue with its portrayal of gay men. TV Guide's Movie Guide, for example, noticed that the gay scene is portrayed in the movie "as irredeemably sick and violent," with "virtually nobody [being] portrayed sympathetically." Brian Juergens, associate editor with gay culture website AfterEllen, contended that the movie "viciously exploited" the gay community, arguing that gay male sexuality does not seem to serve any purpose in the plot other than being a prop to shock heterosexual audiences. Although the film contains a disclaimer saying that it does not intend to be "an indictment of the homosexual world," Juergens states that certain elements in the plot—especially the fact that it is hinted that several gay male killers are operating simultaneously—"makes a clear statement (however unintended the filmmakers may maintain it is) about a community as a whole."

Vito Russo wrote, "Gays who protested the making of the film maintained that it would show that when Pacino recognized his attraction to the homosexual world, he would become psychotic and begin to kill." However, in Exorcising Cruising, a behind-the-scenes documentary on the Cruising DVD, Friedkin claims that the film was supported by much of New York City's leather/S&M community, who appeared by the dozens as extras in the nightclub scenes.

Raymond Murray, editor of Images in the Dark (an encyclopedia of gay and lesbian films) writes that "the film proves to be an entertaining and (for those born too late to enjoy the sexual excesses of pre-AIDS gay life) fascinating if ridiculous glimpse into gay life—albeit Hollywood's version of gay life." He goes on to say "the film is now part of queer history and a testament to how a frightened Hollywood treated a disenfranchised minority."

In retrospect, William Friedkin said: "Cruising came out around a time that gay liberation had made enormous strides among the general public. It also came out around the same time that AIDS was given a name. I simply used the background of the S&M world to do a murder mystery; it was based on a real case. But the timing of it was difficult because of what had been happening to gay people. Of course, it was not really set in a gay world; it was the S&M world. But many critics who wrote for gay publications or the underground press felt that the film was not the best foot forward as far as gay liberation was concerned, and they were right. Now it's reevaluated as a film. It could be found wanting as a film, but it no longer has to undergo the stigma of being an anti-gay screed, which it never was."

In a 2006 interview, Camille Paglia stated: "I loved Cruising—while everyone else was furiously condemning it. It had an underground decadence that wasn't that different from The Story of O or other European high porn of the 1960s." Several film directors also cite the movie as among their favorite films. Quentin Tarantino says that when he was doing a play on Broadway in 1995, he held a screening for gay members of the theatre community and "It just blew their minds. They loved it." Danish film director Nicolas Winding Refn called the film "a masterpiece." The Safdie brothers have also named the film as an influence on their work.

Hate crime connections 
In the 1995 documentary The Celluloid Closet (adapted from Vito Russo's books on homosexual people in the film industry), Ron Nyswaner, screenwriter for Philadelphia, says he and a boyfriend were threatened with violence by a group of men who claimed that Cruising was their motivation.

According to a 2013 book by film professor R. Hart Kylo-Patrick, "Two months after the film's release, a bar prominently displayed in the movie came under attack by a man with a submachine gun, killing two patrons and wounding 12 others. Friedkin refused to comment on the attack." This attack, which occurred November 19, 1980—nine months after the film was released—was carried out by Ronald K. Crumpley, formerly an officer with the New York City Transit Police. He first shot two people outside a delicatessen with an Uzi, then walked a few blocks where he shot into a group of men standing outside the Ramrod. In total, he shot eight people, two of whom died. Crumpley was said to have told the police after his arrest: “I'll kill them all—the gays—they ruin everything." He was found "not responsible by reason of mental disease or defect" and spent the rest of his life at a psychiatric hospital, dying in 2015 at the age of 73. The New York Times covered the incident at the time of the attacks, and revisited it in 2016, following the Pulse Nightclub massacre; these articles do not mention Cruising or Friedkin.

Accolades

Legacy

Mapplethorpe 
Robert Mapplethorpe's initial interest in the black male form was inspired by (in addition to films like Mandingo) the interrogation scene in Cruising, in which an unknown black character enters the interrogation room and slaps the protagonist across the face.

Home media 
A deluxe collector's edition DVD was released in 2007 and 2008 by Warner Home Video. This release was not a director's cut, but did include some scenes not seen in the original VHS release, and additional visual effects added by Friedkin. Friedkin did a director's commentary track for the DVD. This version did not have the disclaimer at the beginning stating that Cruising depicts a gay S&M subculture and is not representative of mainstream gay life. The DVD included two bonus features titled "The History of Cruising" and "Exorcising Cruising," the latter about the controversy the film provoked during principal photography and after it was released. The DVD is no longer available. A special edition Blu-ray with a restored print of the film was released by Arrow on August 20, 2019. It has similar bonus features.

Interior. Leather Bar. 
In 2013, filmmakers James Franco and Travis Mathews released Interior. Leather Bar., a film in which they appear as filmmakers working on a film which reimagines and attempts to recreate the 40 minutes of deleted and lost footage from Cruising. (The period after "Interior" is a reference to Cruising shooting script, describing an indoor scene at such a bar.) The film is not actually a recreation of the footage; instead, it uses a docufiction format to explore the creative and ethical issues arising from the process of trying to film such a project.

See also 
 History of homosexuality in American film

References

Bibliography

Further reading 
 Ercolani, Eugenio / Stiglegger, Marcus (2020). Cruising, Liverpool Univ. Press. 
Nystrom, Derek (2009). Hard Hats, Rednecks, and Macho Men: Class in 1970s American Cinema. Oxford Univ. Press. .
 Savran, David (1998). Taking It Like a Man: White Masculinity, Masochism, and Contemporary American Culture. Princeton University Press. , pp. 213–217.

External links 
 
 
 
 San Francisco Examiner "Lasting images of "Cruising" by Bob Stephens (1995).
 Q Network Film Desk "Cruising" By James Kendrick.
 Cruising: Re-examining the Reviled by Drew Fitzpatrick (Digital Destruction).
 A new stance on William Friedkin's Cruising by Trenton Straube
 Friedkin Out by Bill Krohn at rouge press

1980 films
1980 crime films
1980 LGBT-related films
1980 thriller films
1980s crime thriller films
1980s English-language films
1980s serial killer films
American crime thriller films
American LGBT-related films
American serial killer films
BDSM in films
English-language German films
Fictional portrayals of the New York City Police Department
Films about the New York City Police Department
Film controversies in the United States
Films about police misconduct
Films based on American crime novels
Films directed by William Friedkin
Films scored by Jack Nitzsche
Films set in New York City
Films shot in New York City
Gay-related films
German crime thriller films
German LGBT-related films
German serial killer films
LGBT-related controversies in film
Rating controversies in film
LGBT-related thriller films
Obscenity controversies in film
United Artists films
West German films
1980s American films
1980s German films